The 2012 Oregon Ducks football team represented the University of Oregon in the 2012 NCAA Division I FBS football season. The team played their home games at Autzen Stadium for the 46th straight year, and was coached by Chip Kelly in his fourth and final year at Oregon. They are a member of the Pac-12 Conference in the North Division.

For the fifth straight season, Oregon swept all of their regional rivals in the Pac-12: Oregon State, Washington, and Washington State.

Previous season
The Ducks won their third straight conference title after defeating UCLA in the inaugural Pac-12 Football Championship Game. They represented the Pac-12 in the Rose Bowl, where they defeated Wisconsin 45–38 to win their first Rose Bowl game since 1917. It was their second Rose Bowl appearance in three years and their sixth overall. It was Oregon's fourth consecutive year in a BCS bowl game (prior to which having played in the 2010 Rose Bowl and the 2011 BCS National Championship Game along with the previous Rose Bowl), the longest active streak in college football. The Ducks finished the season 12–1 (8–1 Pac-12).

Before the season

Recruiting

Schedule

Game summaries

Arkansas State

Fresno State

1st quarter scoring: FRES – Quentin Breshears 39 Yd field goal; ORE – De'Anthony Thomas 39 Yd Run (Rob Beard Kick); ORE – Kenjon Barner 3 Yd run (Beard kick)

2nd quarter scoring: ORE – Colt Lyerla 22 Yd Pass From Marcus Mariota (Beard Kick); ORE – De'Anthony Thomas 51 Yd Run (Beard Kick); ORE – Kenjon Barner 3 Yd Run (Beard Kick); FRES – Quentin Breshears 43 Yd field goal

3rd quarter scoring: FRES – Isaiah Burse 18 Yd Pass From Derek Carr (Breshears Kick); FRES – Quentin Breshears 25 Yd field goal

4th quarter scoring: FRES – Quentin Breshears 37 Yd field goal; ORE – Kenjon Barner 16 Yd Run (Beard Kick); FRES – Robbie Rouse 2 Yd Run (Two-Point Pass Conversion Failed)

Tennessee Tech

1st quarter scoring: TNTC – Da'Rick Rogers 23 Yd Pass From Tre Lamb (Zachary Sharp Kick); ORE – Kenjon Barner 1 Yd Run (Rob Beard Kick); ORE – De'Anthony Thomas 59 Yd Run (Beard Kick); ORE – Jake Fisher 1 Yd Pass From Marcus Mariota (Beard Kick)

2nd quarter scoring: ORE – Colt Lyerla 4 Yd Pass From Marcus Mariota (Beard Kick); ORE – De'Anthony Thomas 16 Yd Pass From Marcus Mariota (Beard Kick)

3rd quarter scoring: ORE – Keanon Lowe 3 Yd Pass From Marcus Mariota (Beard Kick); ORE – Bryan Bennett 4 Yd Run (Beard Kick); TNTC – Doug Page 6 Yd Pass From Darian Stone (Sharp Kick); ORE – Bryan Bennett 6 Yd Run (Beard Kick)

4th quarter scoring: ORE – Byron Marshall 4 Yd Run (Beard Kick)

Arizona

1st quarter scoring: ORE – Daryle Hawkins 17 Yd Pass From Marcus Mariota (Rob Beard Kick)

2nd quarter scoring: ORE – Rob Beard 27 Yd field goal; ORE – Rob Beard 41 Yd field goal

3rd quarter scoring: ORE – Colt Lyerla 1 Yd Run (Jackson Rice Pass To Rob Beard For Two-Point Conversion); ORE – Bralon Addison 55 Yd Pass From Marcus Mariota (Beard Kick)

4th quarter scoring: ORE – Ifo Ekpre-Olomu 54 Yd Interception Return (Beard Kick); ORE – Bryan Bennett 8 Yd Run (Beard Kick); ORE – Troy Hill 29 Yd Interception Return (Beard Kick)

Washington State

1st quarter scoring: ORE – Kenjon Barner 22 Yd Run (Two-Point Pass Conversion Failed); WSU – Andrew Furney 18 Yd field goal; ORE – Marcus Mariota 13 Yd Run (Rob Beard Kick); ORE – Kenjon Barner 30 Yd Pass From Marcus Mariota (Beard Kick); WSU – Carl Winston 2 Yd Run (Pat Failed)

2nd quarter scoring: WSU – Andrew Furney 20 Yd field goal; ORE – Rob Beard 34 Yd field goal; WSU – Brett Bartolone 26 Yd Pass From Connor Halliday (Furney Kick)

3rd quarter scoring: ORE – De'Anthony Thomas 4 Yd Run (Beard Kick); ORE – Avery Patterson 34 Yd Interception Return (Beard Kick); ORE – Kenjon Barner 10 Yd Run (Beard Kick)

4th quarter scoring: ORE – Kenjon Barner 80 Yd Run (Beard Kick); WSU – Marquess Wilson 25 Yd Pass From Jeff Tuel (Furney Kick)

Washington

1st quarter scoring: ORE – De'Anthony Thomas 16 Yd Run (Rob Beard Kick); ORE – Keanon Lowe 21 Yd Pass From Marcus Mariota (Beard Kick); ORE – Avery Patterson 43 Yd Interception Return (Beard Kick)

2nd quarter scoring: WASH – Bishop Sankey 1 Yd Run (Travis Coons Kick); ORE – Colt Lyerla 10 Yd Pass From Marcus Mariota (Rob Beard Kick); ORE – Josh Huff 34 Yd Pass From Marcus Mariota (Beard Kick)

3rd quarter scoring: ORE – Rob Beard 28 Yd field goal; WASH – Bishop Sankey 6 Yd Run (Coons Kick)

4th quarter scoring: ORE – Colt Lyerla 13 Yd Pass From Marcus Mariota (Beard Kick); ORE – Byron Marshall 4 Yd Run (Beard Kick); WASH – Erich Wilson II 1 Yd Run (Coons Kick)

Arizona State

1st quarter scoring: ASU – Kevin Ozier 28 Yd Pass From Taylor Kelly (Alex Garoutte Kick); ORE – Kenjon Barner 71 Yd Run (Jackson Rice Pass To Rob Beard For Two-Point Conversion); ORE – Bralon Addison 6 Yd Pass From Marcus Mariota (Beard Kick); ORE – Marcus Mariota 2 Yd Pass From Bryan Bennett (Beard Kick)

2nd quarter scoring: ORE – Kenjon Barner 1 Yd Run (Beard Kick); ORE – Marcus Mariota 86 Yd Run (Beard Kick); ORE – Kenjon Barner 1 Yd Run (Beard Kick)

3rd quarter scoring:

4th quarter scoring: ASU – Anthony Jones 36 Yd Interception Return (Garoutte Kick); ASU – D. J. Foster 23 Yd Pass From Michael Eubank (Garoutte Kick)

Colorado

1st quarter scoring: ORE – Kenjon Barner 1 Yd Run (Rob Beard Kick); ORE – De'Anthony Thomas 9 Yd Run (Beard Kick); ORE – Marcus Mariota 5 Yd Run (Beard Kick); ORE – Bralon Addison 16 Yd Pass From Marcus Mariota (Beard Kick)

2nd quarter scoring: ORE – Kenjon Barner 24 Yd Run (Beard Kick); ORE – De'Anthony Thomas 73 Yd Punt Return (Beard Kick); ORE – Daryle Hawkins 7 Yd Pass From Marcus Mariota (Rob Beard Kick); ORE – Bryan Bennett 6 Yd Run (Beard Kick)

3rd quarter scoring: COLO – Christian Powell 1 Yd Run (Will Oliver Kick); COLO – Christian Powell 20 Yd Run (Oliver Kick); ORE – Bryan Bennett 3 Yd Run (Beard Kick); ORE – Bryan Bennett 17 Yd Run (Beard Kick)

4th quarter scoring:

USC

California

1st quarter scoring: ORE – Colt Lyerla 10 Yd Pass From Marcus Mariota (Alejandro Maldonado Kick); CAL – Darius Powe 10 Yd Pass From Allan Bridgford (Vincenzo D'Amato Kick); ORE – Byron Marshall 3 Yd Run (Maldonado Kick)

2nd quarter scoring: CAL – D'Amato 27 Yd Field Goal; ORE – Maldonado 26 Yd Field Goal; ORE – Josh Huff 10 Yd Pass From Marcus Mariota (Maldonado Kick)

3rd quarter scoring: CAL – Isi Sofele 4 Yd Run (D'Amato Kick); ORE – Josh Huff 35 Yd Pass From Marcus Mariota (Maldonado Kick); ORE – Josh Huff 39 Yd Pass From Marcus Mariota (Maldonado Kick)

4th quarter scoring: ORE – Colt Lyerla 14 Yd Pass From Marcus Mariota (Maldonado Kick); ORE – Will Murphy 7 Yd Pass From Marcus Mariota (Maldonado Kick); ORE – B.J. Kelley 18 Yd Pass From Bryan Bennett (Maldonado Kick)

Stanford

1st quarter scoring:

2nd quarter scoring: STAN – Kevin Hogan 1 Yd Run. (Jordan Williamson Kick); ORE – Keanon Lowe 28 Yd Pass From Marcus Mariota. (Alejandro Maldonado Kick)

3rd quarter scoring: ORE – De'Anthony Thomas 6 Yd Run. (Maldonado Kick);

4th quarter scoring: STAN – Zach Ertz 10 Yd Pass From Kevin Hogan. (Williamson Kick)

Over Time scoring: STAN – Jordan Williamson 37 Yd Field Goal

Oregon State

1st quarter scoring: ORE – Marcus Mariota 42 Yd Run (Two-Point Conversion Failed);ORST – Storm Woods 7 Yd Run (Trevor Romaine Kick)

2nd quarter scoring: ORE – De'Anthony Thomas 2 Yd Run (Maldonado Kick); ORE – Kenjon Barner 1 Yd Run (Maldonado Kick); ORST – Trevor Romaine 36 Yd Field Goal

3rd quarter scoring: ORST – Storm Woods 2 Yd Run (Romaine Kick); ORE – De'Anthony Thomas 5 Yd Run (Maldonado Kick); ORE – De'Anthony Thomas 29 Yd Run (Maldonado Kick)

4th quarter scoring: ORE – Kenjon Barner 1 Yd Run (Maldonado Kick); ORE – B.J. Kelley 2 Yd Pass From Marcus Mariota (Maldonado Kick); ORST – Micah Hatfield 6 Yd Pass From Sean Mannion (Romaine Kick)

Fiesta Bowl

1st quarter scoring:  ORE – De'Anthony Thomas 94 Yd Kickoff Return (Dion Jordan Run For Two-Point Conversion); ORE – De'Anthony Thomas 23 Yd Pass From Marcus Mariota (Alejandro Maldonado Kick)

2nd quarter scoring:  KSU – Collin Klein 6 Yd Run (Anthony Cantele Kick); KSU – Anthony Cantele 25 Yd Field Goal ; ORE – Kenjon Barner 24 Yd Pass From Marcus Mariota (Alejandro Maldonado Kick)

3rd quarter scoring:  ORE – Alejandro Maldonado 33 Yd Field Goal ; ORE – Marcus Mariota 2 Yd Run (Alejandro Maldonado Kick Blocked, Recovered By Kansas State For 1-Point Safety For Oregon)

4th quarter scoring:  KSU – John Hubert 10 Yd Pass From Collin Klein (Anthony Cantele Kick); ORE – Alejandro Maldonado 24 Yd Field Goal

Roster

Notes
November 3, 2012 – Oregon is the first team to score 60 points on USC in 124 years.
November 8, 2012 – USC was reprimanded and fined by the conference for illegally deflated game balls by a student manager during the Oregon game on November 3, 2012.

Coaching staff
Chip Kelly – Head Coach
Steve Greatwood – Offensive Line
Nick Aliotti – Defensive Coordinator
Mark Helfrich – Offensive Coordinator
Gary Campbell – Running Backs
Jerry Azzinaro – Defensive Line
John Neal – Secondary
Tom Osborne – Tight Ends & Special Teams
Don Pellum – Linebackers & Recruiting Coordinator
Scott Frost – Wide Receivers
Jim Radcliffe – Head Strength and Conditioning Coach
Alex Miller – Graduate Assistant Coach
Peter Sirmon – Graduate Assistant Coach
Jeff Hawkins – Senior Associate Athletics Director, Football Operations
Kyle Wiest – Asst. Director of Football Operations
Jim Fisher – Asst. Director of Football Operations/Recruiting

Rankings

References

External links
 2012 Oregon Football Multimedia Guide

Oregon
Oregon Ducks football seasons
Fiesta Bowl champion seasons
Oregon Ducks football